Ammonia is a chemical compound with the formula NH3.
 Ammonia (data page)

Ammonia may also refer to:
 Ammonia (band), an Australian rock band
 Ammonia (genus), a widespread genus of estuarine foraminiferan
 Ammonium hydroxide, a cleaning chemical commonly referred to as ammonia
 Hera Ammonia, an epithet of Greek goddess Hera
 SF Ammonia, a railway ferry in Norway

See also
 Pneumonia